The 2006 European Women Sevens Championship was the fourth edition of the European Women's Sevens Championship.

Emerging (European) Nations 2006 

Played in Hungary.  See 2007 tournament for likely participants. (Source Austria Union)

FIRA-AER Tournament 2006 - Division A 
Venue/Date: Limoges, France, 25–27 May 2006 (Source Fira-Aer) Summarised

Pool Games
POOL One

England 41-0 Germany
Wales 32-0 Switzerland
England 47-0 Switzerland
Wales 20-0 Germany
Germany 24-0 Switzerland
England 7-0 Wales
POOL Two

Spain 12-0 Portugal
Italy 19-0 Czech Republic
Spain 33-0 Czech Republic
Italy 0-12 Portugal
Portugal 17-0 Czech Republic
Spain 36-0 Italy

POOL Three

Netherlands 29-0 Lithuania
 28-0 
Netherlands 33-0 
 22-0 Lithuania
Lithuania 35-0 
Netherlands 21-5 
POOL Four

Sweden 31-0 Norway
Russia 0-17 Ireland
Sweden 0-5 Ireland
Russia 22-0 Norway
Norway 0-27 Ireland
Sweden 22-0 Russia

Classification Stages 
9th-16th Quarter-finals
Germany 35-0 Czech Republic
Russia 24-0 
Lithuania 12-0 Norway
Italy 19-0 Switzerland
13th-16th Semi-finals
 41-0 Czech Republic
Norway 17-0 Switzerland
9th-12th Semi-finals
Germany 0-28 Russia
Lithuania 7-27 Italy
1st-8th Quarter-finals
England 22-0 Portugal
Ireland 15-5 
Netherlands 17-12 Sweden
Spain 3-10 Wales
5th-8th Semi-finals
Sweden 5-17 Spain
Portugal 0-19 
1st-4th Semi-finals
England 21-0 Ireland
Netherlands 0-29 Wales
Finals

15th/16th Final
Czech Republic 12-17 Switzerland
13th/14th Final Copper
 22-5 Norway
11th/12th Final
Germany 26-7 Lithuania
9th/10th Final Bronze
Russia 29-0 Italy
7th/8th Final
Portugal 0-41 Sweden
5th/6th Final Silver
 0-7 Spain
3rd/4th Final
Ireland 0-10 
1st/2nd Final Gold
England 7-10 Wales

FIRA-AER Tournament 2006 - Division B 
Venue/Date: Limoges, France, 25–27 May 2006. (Source Fira-Aer) Summarised
POOL One

Luxembourg 0-17 Romania
Bulgaria 12-0 Israel
Romania 26-0 Bosnia Herzogovina
Bulgaria 14-0 Luxembourg
Israel 5-0 Bosnia Herzogovina
Romania 19-0 Bulgaria
Israel 17-0 Luxembourg
Bulgaria 27-0 Bosnia Herzogovina
Romania 26-7 Israel
Bosnia Herzogovina 15-5 Luxembourg
POOL Two

Andorra 17-0 Poland
Hungary 0-5 Austria
Poland 5-0 Malta
Hungary 7-0 Andorra
Austria 0-12 Malta
Poland 22-0 Hungary
Austria 0-29 Andorra
Hungary 12-19 Malta
Poland 29-0 Austria
Malta 0-15 Andorra

Classification Stages 
5th-8th Semi-finals
Israel 7-0 Hungary
Bosnia Herzogovina 0-24 Malta
1st-4th Semi-finals
Romania 12-10 Poland
Bulgaria 0-22 Andorra

Finals
9th/10th Final
Luxembourg 0-26 Austria
7th/8th Final
Hungary 29-5 Bosnia Herzogovina
5th/6th Final
Israel 7-0 Malta
3rd/4th Final
Poland 10-7 Bulgaria
1st/2nd Final
Romania 7-0 Andorra

References

2006
2006 rugby sevens competitions
sevens
2005–06 in French rugby union
International women's rugby union competitions hosted by France
rugby union
European Women Sevens Championship